The 1941 Detroit Tech Dynamics football team represented the Detroit Institute of Technology as an independent during the 1941 college football season.  In their first and only season under head coach Julius Goldman, the Dynamics compiled a 0–6–1 record.

Prior to 1941, Julius Goldman had been Detroit Tech's backfield coach under head coach Hal Shields. Goldman is best known as a basketball pioneer who advocated the 1936 rule change eliminating the jump ball after every field goal. He was inducted into the Naismith Memorial Basketball Hall of Fame in 1981.

For the 1941 season, the team arranged "the most ambitious schedule in the school's football history." At the start of the season, an Ohio newspaper described the Detroit Tech team as being "untouted and unscouted". Key players included team captain Francis "Red" Logan, playing at the tackle position, as well as end Joe Slezinger and guards Vic Borden and Dick Bruce.

In February 1942, Detroit Tech announced that its withdrawal from intercollegiate football for at least a year or two. As reasons for the decision, Julius Goldman, who was also the school's athletic director, cited the financial loss suffered by the program as well as manpower and scheduling problems.

Schedule

References

Detroit Tech
Detroit Tech Dynamics football seasons
College football winless seasons
Detroit Tech